Surāqa ibn Mālik ibn Juʿshum al-Kinānī was a member of the Kinana tribe which, like its sub-tribe the Quraysh, belongs to the Adnani branch of Arabs. He was a skilled horseman, known for being the only man from Quraysh to successfully locate Muhammad and Abu Bakr during their migration to Medina, hoping to win the bounty that the Quraysh had put on their heads. He was unable to stop them due to miraculous events which are viewed as divine intervention in the Islamic tradition.  He later converted to Islam.

Suraqa's pursuit of Muhammad and Abu Bakr

When Muhammad and Abu Bakr fled from Mecca, the Quraysh announced a reward of 100 camels for anyone who tracked them down. Suraqa ibn Malik was a skilled tracker, and sought to pursue them and collect the bounty.

He succeeded in finding the travelers, but as soon as he caught sight of them, Muhammad reportedly prayed, "O Allah, protect us from him by whatever means You will.” Subsequently, his horse became mired in deep sand. As he was within bow-range of the Prophet and Abu Bakr, he attempted to fire an arrow at them, but as he did his hands suffered from paralysis. He cried out, "O Muhammad, pray for me in order that my mare could get out of this mess. I promise I will retrace my steps and give up the pursuit."

In the narration of Ahmad, Suraqa said, "O Muhammad, I know that this is because of you; pray to Allah to save me from my predicament, and by Allah I shall divert away from you any one who is behind me of those who are seeking you. Here is my quiver, take one arrow. You are going to pass by some camels and sheep of mine in such and such a place, take whatever you need from there." Muhammad said, "I have no need of it." Then he prayed for him as requested.

After he prayed for him, Suraqa's mount was able to free itself from the sand. Suraqa, however, did not honor his promise, and resumed his pursuit. As he approached Muhammad, his mount got stuck in the sand again. Suraqa again prayed: ‘O Prophet, if I was released again, I would surrender my arms and return to Mecca never to pursue you. I would dissuade even others from pursuing you.’

Muhammad prayed again, and again the horse freed itself. Suraqa then declared that Muhammad’s religion would prevail one day and requested Muhammad to hand him a written promise that he would be honoured whenever Muhammad became the head of the Islamic state. Abu Bakr wrote the promise at the behest of Muhammad on a bone and handed it over to Suraqa. As he began to return, Muhammad told him that he would one day wear the bracelets of Khusrow II of Persia. He asked in wonderment if Muhammad meant the bracelets of Khusrow ibn Hormuz (or Khosrow II, son of Hormizd IV), the Persian king. Muhammad nodded in acknowledgment.

Suraqa encountered several contingents of Quraysh who were looking for Muhammad and persuaded them to get back to Mecca as he had found no trace of the pair on the route to Medina. The only person whom he told of his encounter was Abu Jahl, who reproached him for his cowardice.

After the conquest of Mecca

Within eight years of his migration to Medina, Muhammad entered Mecca at the head of a large army and declared a general amnesty. It is related that he always regretted pursuing Muhammad. He grieved on the day Muhammad died, but remembered the promise of Muhammad that he would one day wear the bangles of Khosrow II of Persia.

In 643 CE/22 AH, Suraqa became ill and was near death. His family prepared for his death, but Suraqa awoke and asked them what they were doing. They told him that they are preparing for his burial because they did not think he would survive. He replied that they were not to worry about him because he would not die. When the family members asked how he knew, he said that Muhammad had assured him that he would wear Khusrow's bangles and that he had not gotten them yet.

Sassanid Persia was conquered during the caliphate of second caliph, Umar ibn al-Khattab. Umar received a missive from Saad ibn Abi Waqqas, commander of the Islamic forces during the 
Islamic conquest of Persia. A fifth of the booty was sent to Umar in Medina. It contained the famed crown of Khosrow studded with rubies, a gold belt studded with pearls and the gold bracelets. Umar was looking at each of the items sent by the Commander of the forces. Suddenly Umar called Suraqa to him and put the crown on his head, helped him don the gold embroidered dress and gold bracelets.

Suraqa was uncomfortable wearing these items, so he lifted his hands to the sky and prayed: ‘O my Lord, how could I put on something which your Prophet deserved far more than I? I smell the air of punishment in it."

He then turned towards Umar and asked him to distribute all those royal appendages among the Muslims.

References

Kinana
Companions of the Prophet
7th-century Arabic poets
645 deaths